Paragoge (from  additional: παρα- prefix para- 'extra', ἀγωγή agogē 'bringing in') is the addition of a sound to the end of a word. Often caused by nativization, it is a type of epenthesis, most commonly vocalic epenthesis.

Paragoge is particularly common in Brazilian Portuguese, not only in loanwords but also in word derivation. It is also present in the accents of many Brazilians while speaking foreign languages such as English.

Some languages have undergone paragoge as a sound change, and modern forms are longer than the historical forms they are derived from. Italian sono 'I am', from Latin sum, is an example. Sometimes, as above, the paragogic vowel is an echo vowel, such as Proto-Oceanic *saqat "bad" > Uneapa zaɣata.

In loanwords
Some languages add a sound to the end of a loanword when it would otherwise end in a forbidden sound. Some languages add a grammatical ending to the end of a loanword to make it declinable.

Examples
English rack → Finnish ;
English gal → Japanese  (gyaru);
English golf → Portuguese

Grammatical endings
English computer → Latvian ;
Ottoman Turkish  (rakı) > South Slavic rakia.

In inherited words
Paragoge can occur in the inherited words of a language as well. This is the case with many words in Romance languages.

Examples
Latin  → Italian 
Latin fine → Catalan fins
Proto-Oceanic *saqat "bad" > *saqati > Tamambo sati

References

Sources
Crowley, Terry (1997): An Introduction to Historical Linguistics. 3rd edition. Oxford University Press.
Sorbet, Piotr (2019): "El mecanismo de paragoge". In: LÓPEZ GONZÁLEZ, Antonio María, KOBYŁECKA-PIWOŃSKA, Ewa, KŁOSIŃSKA-NACHIN, Agnieszka, BARAN, Marek (eds.): Voces dialogantes, Wydawnictwo Uniwersytetu Łódzkiego, 375-384.

Phonology